KCHR-FM (107.3 FM, "Bob FM") is a radio station broadcasting an adult hits music format. Licensed to Cotton Plant, Arkansas, the station is currently owned by Caldwell Media.

History
The station signed on in August 2008 as KAPW and featured The Steve Harvey Morning Show and Keith Sweat Hotel as programming.

On August 1, 2011, KAPW changed its call letters to KERL and changed its format to classic rock, branded as "Earl FM".

On November 21, 2014, KERL moved from 99.3 FM to 107.3 FM.

In mid-December 2019, the station changed its format to adult hits, branded as "Bob FM".

On February 14, 2020, the station changed its call sign to KCHR-FM.

External links

CHR-FM
Adult hits radio stations in the United States
Radio stations established in 2008
2008 establishments in Arkansas
Bob FM stations